David Joseph Kneeland (December 3, 1881 – November 15, 1948) was an American track and field athlete who competed in the 1904 Summer Olympics. In 1904 he was sixth in marathon competition. He was born in San Francisco, California, and died in Winthrop, Massachusetts.

References

External links
list of American athletes

1881 births
1948 deaths
American male marathon runners
Olympic track and field athletes of the United States
Athletes (track and field) at the 1904 Summer Olympics
20th-century American people